Angelos Misos (born March 7, 1971) is a former international Cypriot football defender.

He started his career in 1993 from AEK Larnaca and he spent his career mainly there, where he played for six years. He had also played for teams such as APOEL, AEL Limassol, Enosis Neon Paralimni and Omonia Aradippou.

External links
 

1971 births
Living people
AEK Larnaca FC players
APOEL FC players
AEL Limassol players
Enosis Neon Paralimni FC players
Cypriot footballers
Cyprus international footballers
Greek Cypriot people
Association football defenders